The Platte Purchase was a land acquisition in 1836 by the United States government from American Indian tribes of the region. It comprised lands along the east bank of the Missouri River and added  to the northwest corner of the state of Missouri.

This expansion of the slave state of Missouri was in violation of the Missouri Compromise of 1820, which prohibited the extension of slavery in the former Louisiana Territory north of the parallel 36°30′ north, except within the boundaries of the state of Missouri, as defined at the time of the adoption of the Missouri Compromise. The area acquired was almost as large as the states of Delaware and Rhode Island combined, and extended Missouri westward along the river. St. Joseph, one of the main river ports of departure for the westward migration of American pioneers, was located in the new acquisition.

The region of the Platte Purchase includes the following modern counties within its bounds: Andrew (435 square miles, 1127 km2), Atchison (545 square miles, 1412 km2), Buchanan (410 square miles, 1062 km2), Holt (462 square miles, 1197 km2), Nodaway (877 square miles, 2271 km2), and Platte (420 square miles, 1088 km2). It also includes what are now the northwest suburbs of Kansas City, a small area of Kansas City proper, the cities of St. Joseph and Maryville, Missouri, as well as Kansas City International Airport and almost all of Missouri's portion of Interstate 29, save the small portion which runs concurrently with Interstate 35 in Clay County.

Purchase
When Missouri entered the Union, its western border was established as 
"a meridian line passing through the middle of the mouth of the Kansas river, where the same empties into the Missouri river, thence, from the point aforesaid north, along the said meridian line, to the intersection of the parallel of latitude which passes through the rapids of the river Des Moines, making the said line correspond with the Indian boundary line."The purchase extended Missouri's western border north of the Kansas River east along the Missouri River to 95°46′ west longitude.

Less than a year after the Indian Removal Act of 1830, by which the US was authorized to remove the Missouri General Assembly was petitioning Congress to more clearly define the border on the northwest corner of the state. The Legislature noted the boundary was not clear, and that the land was not surveyed, thus leading to settlers encroaching on the lands. The most spectacular example of encroachment was Joseph Robidoux, who had been operating an American Fur Company trading post at St. Joseph, Missouri since 1826.

On January 27, 1835, Senator Lewis F. Linn wrote John Dougherty, an Indian agent, to inquire about acquiring the land. Dougherty agreed, noting that the territory was preventing access to Missouri River shipping by Missouri residents east of the purchase line. According to an early 20th-century historian, Dougherty's reputation among the Native Americans was that of the "Controller of Fire-water" from the Missouri River to the Columbia River.

The first tribes to give up their land were the Potawatomi, who ceded their land in the Treaty of Chicago. They agreed to this in 1833 but the treaty wasn't finalized until 1835. The Potawatomi (about 1,000 to 2,000) moved north to a reservation in Pottawattamie County, Iowa (Council Bluffs, Iowa). They moved again 1837–1838 in the Potawatomi Trail of Death to Osawatomie, Kansas.

The formal application came in the summer of 1835 at a meeting on the Dawes farm near Liberty, Missouri. Andrew S. Hughes, the US Indian agent for the Sac and Fox tribes, presided over a meeting of Missouri residents who formally asked Congress to acquire the land. Missouri senator Thomas Hart Benton introduced a bill to acquire the land and it was approved with little opposition in June 1836.

An agreement was reached on September 17, 1836, with the chiefs Mahaska and No Heart of the Ioway tribe and leaders of the combined Sac and Fox tribes in a ceremony at Fort Leavenworth, Kansas. It was presided by William Clark, the Superintendent of Indian Affairs, who was based in St. Louis. (He was one of the leaders of the Lewis and Clark Expedition.)

The Senate approved the treaty on February 15, 1837. On March 28, 1837, President Martin Van Buren issued a proclamation supporting the annexation. In October 1837, the Missouri General Assembly accepted the land and placed it all initially in the newly created Platte County.

This addition increased the land area of what was already the largest state in the Union at the time (about 66,500 square miles (172,000 km2) to Virginia's 65,000 square miles, which then included West Virginia).  The acquisition challenged the Missouri Compromise of 1820 by expanding slavery into free territory north of the southern Missouri border with Arkansas (Parallel 36°30′ north), and the Indian Removal Act. It required a second relocation of tribes who had just been moved "permanently" west of the Missouri border, as part of the forced Indian removal policy of ethnic cleansing from lands wanted by whites.

The tribes were paid $7,500 for their land. The U.S. government was "to provide agricultural implements, furnish livestock", and a host of other small items. The tribes agreed to move to reservations west of the Missouri River in what was to become Kansas and Nebraska. Furthermore, the U.S. government was to "build five comfortable houses for each tribe, break up  of land, fence  of land, furnish a farmer, blacksmith, teacher, interpreter." The reservations are today known as the Iowa Reservation and the Sac and Fox Reservation. The tribes gave up 3.1 thousand square miles of land for reservations of 29 square miles combined (26 for the Sac and Fox and 3 for the Ioway).

Michigan entered the Union in January 1837. By the time the Platte Purchase was finalized, Missouri remained the second biggest state.

Settlement
The U.S. Government set up a General Land Office in Plattsburg, Missouri to handle the settlement. Much of the land was dispensed as military land warrants to veterans of the War of 1812 (and later Mexican–American War). Under the terms of the program, which was expanded in 1855, the 160-acre land grants could be given to military descendants and those grants could be sold.

Initial settlement was concentrated in the Town of Barry in south Platte County. Almost overnight, Platte County became the second-largest county in the state, and Weston, Missouri ("West Town") was second only to St. Louis, Missouri in the state. St. Joseph would subsequently become the second-largest city in the state in the early settlement days. Since the purchase opened up a new slave area, the area was settled primarily by slaveholders from the Upper South: Virginia, Tennessee and Kentucky. They brought enslaved African Americans with them or purchased them at slave markets, to work such Southern commodity crops as the labor-intensive hemp and tobacco. These were grown in the southern portion of the purchase, where farms and plantations had access to the Missouri River for shipping to market. The northern portion of the purchase attracted fewer Southerners and slaveholding was rare.

Today the Platte Purchase area is among the most rural areas in Missouri. St. Joseph and Maryville, Missouri are the only communities totally within the purchase area that have populations greater than 10,000. Kansas City, Missouri has influenced the area, expanding its boundaries into southern Platte County.

See also 
 Historic regions of the United States
 Ioway Reservation
 Sac and Fox Reservation

External links
Kansas Historical Society history
Nativeweb history including the treaty

Notes

Former regions and territories of the United States
History of Missouri
Regions of Missouri
Aboriginal title in the United States
1836 establishments in the United States